Kaarina (i.e. "Saint Catherine's") is a small town and municipality of Finland.

It is located in the Southwest Finland region and is a neighbouring town of Turku, which is the capital of Southwest Finland, therefore Kaarina is a part of the Greater Turku region.

The municipality is unilingually Finnish, with a Swedish minority and e.g. a Swedish comprehensive school. Bilinguality was proposed but rejected in 2015.

The famous fetish artist Tom of Finland was born in Kaarina.
Kaarina has a well known football team Kaarinan Pojat as well as Kino Piispanristi, the largest independent cinema in Southwest Finland. 

The municipality of Kuusisto was consolidated with Kaarina in 1946. The municipality of Piikkiö was consolidated with Kaarina on 1 January 2009. At the same time, Kaarina adopted the coat of arms of Piikkiö.

Politics
Results of the 2011 Finnish parliamentary election in Kaarina:

National Coalition Party   29.7%
Social Democratic Party   21.2%
True Finns   17.8%
Left Alliance   9.5%
Green League   7.1%
Centre Party   6.6%
Swedish People's Party   3.4%
Christian Democrats   2.8%

Images

International relations

Twin towns — Sister cities

Kaarina is twinned with:

 Ansião, Portugal
 Jõgeva, Estonia
 Enköping, Sweden  
 Szentes, Hungary
 Sovetsky, Russia

See also
Kuusisto Castle
Ravattula Church

References

External links

 
Cities and towns in Finland
Populated coastal places in Finland
Populated places established in 1869
1869 establishments in the Russian Empire